Bogovë Nature Park is a nature park in southern Albania, spanning an area of . It was established in 1977 to protect several ecosystems and biodiversity of national importance. The nature park of Bogovë falls inside the Pindus Mountains mixed forests terrestrial ecoregion of the Palearctic Mediterranean forests, woodlands, and scrub biome.

See also  
 Protected areas of Albania
 Geography of Albania
 Biodiversity of Albania

References 

 

Nature parks in Albania
Geography of Berat County
Tourist attractions in Berat County
Tourist attractions in Albania